= Richard Ayvazyan =

American fraudster

Richard Ayvazyan is a convicted fraudster, serving a 17-year prison sentence in Lompoc, California for defrauding the U.S. government of millions of dollars in relief funds authorized by Congress because of the financial impact of the COVID-19 pandemic. He was an international fugitive living in Montenegro with his wife, Marietta Terabelian until he was caught and extradited to the United States in 2022.

While awaiting sentencing in August 2021, Ayvazyan and his wife allegedly cut their ankle tracking devices and fled. The FBI offered a reward of up to $20,000 for information leading to their arrest.
